Duck River is a  river in the state of Alabama.  It is a tributary of the Mulberry Fork of the Black Warrior River and forms a portion of the border between Cullman and Blount counties.

References

 Preventing the duck river dam at alabamarivers.org
 Duck River Watershed Project st epa.gov

Rivers of Alabama
Rivers of Cullman County, Alabama
Rivers of Blount County, Alabama